Lee Myung-Sun (born 12 February 1976) is a retired South Korean shot putter. Her personal best throw is 19.36 metres, achieved in April 2000 in Shanghai. This is the current South Korean record.

Achievements

References

External links

1976 births
Living people
South Korean female shot putters
Athletes (track and field) at the 1996 Summer Olympics
Athletes (track and field) at the 2000 Summer Olympics
Olympic athletes of South Korea
Athletes (track and field) at the 1998 Asian Games
Athletes (track and field) at the 2002 Asian Games
Asian Games medalists in athletics (track and field)
Universiade medalists in athletics (track and field)
Asian Games silver medalists for South Korea
Medalists at the 2002 Asian Games
Universiade silver medalists for South Korea
Competitors at the 1997 Summer Universiade
Medalists at the 2001 Summer Universiade
Medalists at the 2003 Summer Universiade